Crook County Christian School, known as CCCS, is a private Christian school affiliated with the Assembly of God in Prineville, Oregon, United States.

The school has been accredited through the Association of Christian Schools International since 1994, and through the Northwest Association of Accredited Schools since 2000. The CCCS' high school classes were almost closed in 2009, but remained open for the 2009 to 2010 school year. As of 2013, the school has grades K through 8.

References

Christian schools in Oregon
High schools in Crook County, Oregon
Educational institutions established in 1994
Prineville, Oregon
Private high schools in Oregon
Private elementary schools in Oregon
Private middle schools in Oregon
1994 establishments in Oregon